The 1924 Hessian state election was held on 7 December 1924 to elect the 70 members of the Landtag of Hesse.

Results

References 

Hesse
Elections in Hesse
December 1924 events